Verbesina virginica, known by the common names white crownbeard, or frostweed is a species of flowering plant in the family Asteraceae.
It is native to the Southeastern United States, where it is found in calcareous soil, often in bottomland thickets and edges of woods.

It is a tall biennial species. It produces heads of white flowers in late summer through fall. The name "frostweed" refers to its tendency to produce frost flowers in freezing weather.

Description
Flower heads consist of multiple flowers arranged in a cluster, or corymb, at the terminal end of the stems. Each flower head actually consists of 1 to 5 ray florets and 8 to 15 disk florets.

References 

virginica